ESPN Australia is the Australian division of ESPN, part of the ESPN International grouping. It is offered in Australia, New Zealand, Papua New Guinea and the Pacific Islands.

Initially, ESPN was known as Sports ESPN on the Optus Vision cable television system, and focused on sports aired by its home network in the United States, including American football, baseball, and basketball. In order to expand its local reach, it has shown an increasing number of soccer games including FA Cup, World Cup qualifying games and Major League Soccer. Also on the network schedule are rugby matches, among other sports.

ESPN Australia has also commenced showing locally produced content including Australian versions of PTI and SportsCenter. They also air a soccer discussion show Monday to Friday called ESPNsoccernet PressPass which is hosted by Andrew Orsatti.

On 1 March 2011, ESPN2 launched in Australia both in standard and high definition formats.

History
It became available on Austar in April 1999, and Foxtel in September 2002.

The broadcast of Jarryd Hayne's debut for the San Francisco 49ers in the National Football League on 15 September 2015 drew the network's highest ever audience with 116,000 viewers watching the game live, beating the previous audience record of 107,100 viewers for Super Bowl XLVIII in 2014.

Content
The following is the list of sports programming shown on ESPN channels (with some being shown only on ESPN and not ESPN2, and vice versa).

American Football
 National Football League (includes NFL Draft, Sunday Night Football, Monday Night Football, Thursday Night Football, three Sunday afternoon games, all NFL Network games, NFL RedZone, Pro Bowl plus all the Playoff games and Super Bowl)
 College football (includes regular season, Heisman Trophy, College Football Playoff and College Football Championship Game)
 XFL

Baseball
 Major League Baseball (includes Sunday, Monday, Tuesday, Wednesday, Thursday, Friday and Saturday Night Baseball, MLB Strike Zone, Home Run Derby, All-Star Game, all playoff games and World Series)
 College baseball
 Little League World Series
 World Baseball Classic

Basketball
 National Basketball Association (includes NBA Draft, NBA All-Star Weekend, Wednesday and Friday games (mostly doubleheaders), Saturday games (including all ABC games), ESPN/ABC games on Monday and Sunday, all TNT games, playoff games and NBA Finals)
 FIBA Basketball World Cup (Except New Zealand)
 FIBA Women's Basketball World Cup (Except New Zealand)
 National Basketball League (Except New Zealand)
 Women's National Basketball League (Except New Zealand) 
 Women's National Basketball Association
 College basketball
 NBA Summer League
 Basketball Africa League
 NBA G League
 The Basketball Tournament

Extreme Sports
 X Games

Horse Racing
 Kentucky Derby
 Preakness Stakes
 Belmont Stakes

Ice Hockey
 National Hockey League
 Swedish Hockey League

Mixed martial arts
 UFC (Fight Night and PPV preliminaries)

Multi-Sport Events 
 Special Olympics World Games
 Aurora Games

Professional wrestling
 All Elite Wrestling (includes AEW Dynamite, AEW Rampage and quarterly pay-per-view events)

Soccer
 Belgian First Division A (only on Watch ESPN)
 Belgian Cup (only on Watch ESPN)
 Belgian Super Cup 
 WAFU Nations Cup
 Toulon Tournament

Other programming
 NCAA events
 ESPN Films
 World's Strongest Man
 ESPY Award

News and talk shows
 Around the Horn
 E:60
 First Take
 Highly Questionable
 Jalen & Jacoby
 Outside the Lines
 Pardon the Interruption Australia
 SportsCenter
 SportsCenter Australia

ESPN HD
ESPN HD was one of the first five channels to be available in HD when Foxtel HD+ launched. ESPN HD commenced in June 2008. The SD version of ESPN began broadcasting in widescreen on 25 January 2010.
On 2 June 2011 ESPN HD (the HD simulcast) and ESPN3.com launched in New Zealand on Sky.

ESPN 3D
ESPN 3D launched in Australia on 30 July 2010. The channel launched to show 8 hours of the X Games 16 live in 3D.
Foxtel 3D launched on 1 November 2010 which shows all of ESPN 3D's content – with ESPN 3D no longer having its own channel. ESPN 3D was shut down on 30 September 2013, citing "limited viewer adoption of 3D services".

See also

 List of sports television channels

References

External links
 ESPN website
 Watch ESPN website

1995 establishments in Australia
English-language television stations in Australia
Australia
Sports television networks in Australia
Television channels and stations established in 1995